Arsenio Comamala López-Del Pan (1888 – Unknown) was a Spanish footballer who played as a midfielder for FC Barcelona and Madrid FC. He is best known for being one of the first players to move from FC Barcelona to Madrid FC.

Career 
Born in Barcelona. Arsenio began his career at his hometown club FC Barcelona in 1903, together with his brother, Carles. They played for Barça until 1911, being part of the club's first great team in the early 1910s, which had the likes of Massana, Amechazurra, Peris, Paco Bru and the Wallace brothers (Charles and Percival). He helped this side win the Catalan championship three times in a row between 1909 and 1911, along with two Pyrenees Cups (1910 and 1911), and one Copa del Rey in 1910, starting in the final where he helped Barça to a 3–2 comeback win over Español de Madrid.

In 1911 some Barcelona players left the club due to financial differences, including the Comamala brothers, but while Carles signed for Universitary SC, Arsenio joined Madrid FC, but eventually also joined Universitary in 1912, and shortly before the end of the year, both joined Casual SC, together with other Barcelona dissidents such as José Quirante and the Wallace brothers. In 1913 Casual folded due to financial reasons and while Carles decided to retire, Arsenio returned to Madrid FC, before retiring at the end of the 1913–14 season.

Personal life 
His brothers Carles and Áureo were also footballers, who both also played for Barcelona. His wife Montserrat Valls was great-aunt of former French Prime Minister Manuel Valls.

Honours
FC Barcelona
Catalan championship:
Champions (4):  1904–05, 1908–09, 1909–10 and 1910–11

Pyrenees Cup:
Champions (2): 1910 and 1911

Copa del Rey:
Champions (1): 1910

References 

1888 births
Year of death missing
Spanish footballers
Association football midfielders
FC Barcelona players
Real Madrid CF players
Footballers from Barcelona